Epitrix cucumeris, the potato flea beetle, is a species of flea beetle in the family Chrysomelidae. It is native to North America, and has been introduced to Portugal and Spain.

References

Further reading

 
 

Alticini
Articles created by Qbugbot
Beetles described in 1851
Agricultural pest insects